Suragi may refer to
 the autobiography of U. R. Ananthamurthy
 the house of U. R. Ananthamurthy
 the Japanese aircraft carrier Katsuragi